Birmingham Thyagaraja Festival is an annual Carnatic culture musical event that takes place in Solihull in UK. It is conducted by the south Asian non-profit organization ShruthiUK. The festival is named after Saint Tyagaraja, a prominent 18th-century Indian composer of Carnatic music.

Affiliations
 In 2018, the festival helped raise funds for the British Heart Foundation to help fund research into the prevention, diagnosis and treatment of heart disease.

References

External links 
 Official website

Music festivals in the West Midlands (county)
Carnatic classical music festivals
Annual events in England
Solihull